Associazione Sportiva Volley Lube is a professional volleyball team based in Treia, Italy. Since 1995 the club has been playing in the Serie A of the Italian Volleyball League. It won the Italian Championship seven times, the Italian Cup five times, and the Italian SuperCup three-times.

At European level, Lube won two CEV Champions League in 2002 and 2019, the CEV Cup in 2001, 2005, 2006 and a CEV Challenge Cup 2011. In 2019, it won the FIVB Men's Club World Volleyball Championship.

Achievements
 CEV Champions League
  (×2) 2002, 2019
  (×1) 2018
  (×2) 2016, 2017 
 CEV Challenge Cup
  (×4) 2001, 2005, 2006, 2011
  (×1) 2003
  (×1) 1998
 FIVB Club World Championship
  (×1) 2019
  (×3) 2017, 2018, 2021
 Italian Championship
  (×7) 2006, 2012, 2014, 2017, 2019, 2021, 2022
  (×1) 2018
  (×5) 2003, 2004, 2009, 2011, 2013
 Italian Cup
  (×7) 2001, 2003, 2008, 2009, 2017, 2020, 2021
  (×4) 2012, 2013, 2018, 2019
 Italian SuperCup
  (×4) 2006, 2008, 2012, 2014
  (×7) 2001, 2003, 2009, 2013, 2017, 2020, 2022

Former names
1990–1994: Lube Carima Treia
1994–1995: Lube Carima Macerata
1995–2012: Lube Banca Marche Macerata
2012–2014: Cucine Lube Banca Marche Macerata
2014–2015: Cucine Lube Banca Marche Treia
2015–2016: Cucine Lube Banca Marche Civitanova
2016–present: Cucine Lube Civitanova

Grounds 
Although until the landing in Serie A2 the team kept the name of the town Treia (a village near Macerata), given the lack of a building or a simple gym it was immediately associated with the PalaFontescodella, which was the historic building of the Lube until 2015. The small capacity of the building (2,100 seats) condemned it to play all the Champions League matches and the important Serie A1 matches in larger arenas around the Marche (Pesaro, Ancona etc ...). After an infinite number of disputes with the Municipality of Macerata (owner of the building) for the expansion of the sports hall, the team decided to accept the offer of the Municipality of Civitanova Marche to move to a new sports hall built by them exclusively for Lube. The new 4,200-seat sports hall was inaugurated in 2015 and was called Eurosuole Forum for sponsorship reasons.

Team 
Team roster – season 2022/2023

Notable players

 1994–1999  Slobodan Kovač
 1996–1998  Andrea Zorzi
 1996–2003  Marco Meoni
 1997–2001  Simone Rosalba
 1997–2002, 2003–2008,2009–2011, 2013–2015  Alessandro Paparoni
 1999–2010  Mirko Corsano
 2000–2001  Dejan Brđović
 2001–2003  Pasquale Gravina
 2001–2002, 2003–2008   Andrija Gerić
 2001–2005  Marco Bracci
 2001–2003  Wout Wijsmans
 2002–2003  Edin Škorić
 2002–2004  Nalbert Bitencourt
 2002–2005  Luigi Mastrangelo
 2003–2004  Fabio Vullo
 2003–2008  Andrija Gerić
 2004–2005  Lorenzo Bernardi
 2005–2009  Rodrigão
 2007–2010  Sebastian Świderski
 2007–2011  Valerio Vermiglio
 2009–2010  Alberto Cisolla
 2010–2011  Facundo Conte
 2010–2011  Romain Vadeleux
 2010–2013  Cristian Savani
 2012–2014, 2021–present  Ivan Zaytsev
 2012–2014  Saša Starović
 2012–2015  Hubert Henno
 2003–2004  Leondino Giombini
 2013–2015  Bartosz Kurek
 2015  Ricardo Garcia
 2008–2016  Marko Podraščanin
 2011–2016  Simone Parodi
 2014–2016  Alessandro Fei
 2000–2007, 2015–2016  Ivan Miljković
 2009–2019  Dragan Stanković
 2015–2022  Osmany Juantorena
 2015–2018  Jenia Grebennikov
 2015–2018  Micah Christenson
 2016–2019  Tsvetan Sokolov
 2017–2018  Taylor Sander
 2018–2020  Bruno Rezende
 2019–2020  Amir Ghafour
 2018–2022  Robertlandy Simón
 2021–2022  Ricardo Lucarelli

Kit manufacturer
The table below shows the history of kit providers for the Lube team.

Sponsorship
The main sponsor has always been the furniture company Cucine Lube, owner of the team, from 1995 (with the arrival in Serie A1) to 2005 and from 2008 to 2016 another main sponsor was added: the Banca Marche bank. In the 2010/11 season, other shirt sponsors were seen: the agricultural company Oro della Terra, the computer company Macrosoft and the University of Macerata. Banca Marche's successor "UBI Banca" was a main sponsor in the 2017/18 season. From 2018 the subsection of Cucine Lube "Creo Kitchens" appeared in the jersey and from 2019 the company Var Group is also seen.

References

External links
 Official website
 Team profile at Volleybox.net

Italian volleyball clubs
Macerata
Volleyball clubs established in 1990
1990 establishments in Italy